The following is a list of episodes of the television series 19 Kids and Counting. The program is a reality/documentary series about the Duggar Family, shown on TLC. The series began on September 29, 2008, and has had ten seasons, plus eighteen specials to date. TLC suspended airing the show on May 22, 2015, and officially canceled it on July 16, 2015. The last episode aired May 19, 2015.

Series overview

Episodes

Season 1 (2008)

* One-hour episode

Season 2 (2009)
Starting with episode nine, the series name was changed to 18 Kids and Counting.

* One-hour episode

Season 3 (2009)

Season 4 (2010)
Starting with this season, the show's title was changed to 19 Kids and Counting.

* One-hour episode

Season 5 (2011)

* One-hour episode

Season 6 (2012)

* One-hour episode

Season 7 (2013)

* One-hour episode

Season 8 (2014) 

* One-hour episode

Season 9 (2014)

* One-hour episode

Season 10 (2015)

* One-hour episode

Specials and miniseries

Pre-series

Series specials

Duggars World Tour

Bates spin-off

Duggars Do Asia

Josh and Anna

Amy Duggar

Jill & Jessa Counting On

See also 
 List of Counting On episodes

References 

18 Kids and Counting